Sabbatius of Solovki ( - Savvaty Solovetsky; died September 27, 1435) was one of the founders of the Solovetsky Monastery.

Life
Savvaty (Sabbatius) was a monk at Kirillo-Belozersky Monastery. Searching for an even more secluded place for complete solitude and silent prayer, he found out that there was a large deserted island in the White Sea.

He heard of Valaam Monastery on the Lake Ladoga and its monks, who had been leading an austere lifestyle. In 1429 Savvaty moved to this island. Savvaty settled near a chapel on the Vyg River. There, he met a monk by the name of German (Herman), who had lived in the woods in solitude. German agreed to accompany Savvaty on his voyage to the island and stay there with him. When they reached the island, they erected a cross and a hermit's cell some 13 km from today's Solovetsky Monastery. After Savvaty's death, newly arrived monks began the construction of the monastery which would come to be known as Solovetsky. Since 1547, Savvaty has been venerated as a saint by the Russian Orthodox Church.

References 

1435 deaths
Russian saints of the Eastern Orthodox Church
White Sea
Russian Orthodox monks
15th-century Christian saints
Year of birth unknown